Tobias Klysner Breuner (born 3 July 2001) is a Danish professional footballer who plays as a winger for Danish Superliga club Randers FC.

Club career

Randers FC
Klysner started playing football at Randers FC, before moving to Randers' cooperative club, Hornbæk SF. However, he later returned to Randers again and signed a three-year youth contract with the club on his 15th birthday.

On 14 April 2019, Klysner made his professional debut for Randers, in a Danish Superliga match against Hobro IK. Klysner started on the bench, but replaced Mikkel Kallesøe in the 91st minute, contributing to a 2–1 win. He was called up for four more games season, however as an unused substitute. Randers confirmed on 11 June 2019, that Klysner had signed a professional four-year contract with the club and was permanently promoted to the first team squad.

Klysner scored his first professional goal on 30 October 2020, in a league game against Vejle Boldklub. After coming off the bench for Tosin Kehinde he scored only a few minutes later to help Randers to a 3–0 away win. In January 2021, 19-year old Klysner once again, signed a new deal with Randers, this time until June 2024. He won his first trophy at the end of the season, as Randers beat SønderjyskE by 4–0 in the final.

Honours
Randers
 Danish Cup: 2020–21

References

External links
Profile at the Randers FC website
Tobias Klysner at DBU 

2001 births
Living people
Association football wingers
Danish men's footballers
Danish Superliga players
Randers FC players
Denmark youth international footballers
People from Randers
Sportspeople from the Central Denmark Region